Hunter Reid Yurachek (born October 21, 1968) is an American university sports administrator who currently serves as athletic director at the University of Arkansas. He was previously the athletic director for Coastal Carolina University.

Early life and education
Hunter Yurachek was born on October 21, 1968 in Richmond, Virginia and was raised in Charlotte, North Carolina. He lettered four years in basketball and received his bachelor's degree at Guilford College in 1990, and then his master's degree from the University of Richmond in 1994.

Athletic Director

Coastal Carolina
After stints at Wake Forest, Vanderbilt, Western Carolina, Virginia, and Akron, Yurachek was named athletic director for Coastal Carolina University. He was named the 2014 FCS Athletic Director of the Year while at Coastal Carolina.

Arkansas
After a stint at Houston as vice president for athletics, Yurachek once again became an athletic director, this time at the University of Arkansas. Yurachek has helped improve Arkansas both in and out of sports, overseeing Arkansas programs win their first SEC and national titles, along with setting a spring term GPA record with an average 3.43 GPA.

References

Arkansas Razorbacks athletic directors
Living people
1968 births
Sportspeople from Richmond, Virginia
Sportspeople from Charlotte, North Carolina
Guilford College alumni
University of Richmond alumni
Coastal Carolina Chanticleers athletic directors
Houston Cougars athletic directors